There were 1,322 individuals who were decorated by the Order of the People's hero of Yugoslavia between 1942 and 1973. Many busts and memorials were built in honor of each People's hero. Each of them usually had a bust in his birthplace or at the place of his death. Most of these monuments are built in figurative style, but some of them were completely abstract, e.g. monument of Ivo Lola Ribar, built at Glamoč field in 1962.

For the list of monuments of the People's Heroes in the each Republic of Former Yugoslavia, see:
List of People's Heroes of Yugoslavia monuments in Bosnia and Herzegovina
List of People's Heroes of Yugoslavia monuments in Croatia
List of People's Heroes of Yugoslavia monuments in Montenegro
List of People's Heroes of Yugoslavia monuments in North Macedonia
List of People's Heroes of Yugoslavia monuments in Serbia
List of People's Heroes of Yugoslavia monuments in Slovenia

See also
Yugoslav Partisans
List of Yugoslav World War II monuments and memorials

 
Yugoslav culture
Propaganda in Yugoslavia
 Heroes of Yugoslavia
Cultural depictions of Yugoslav people